Zak Greant has been a participant in free software and open source communities, including PHP, MySQL, Mozilla, the Free Software Foundation and the Open Source Initiative.

He has previously worked for MySQL AB, Sxip Identity, eZ Systems and Mozilla. He has been primary author on two books.

Books
 2006 MySQL Phrasebook - 
 2003 PHP Functions Essential Reference -

References

External links
 Zak Greant's blog

Year of birth missing (living people)
Living people
PHP writers
Web developers
Canadian technology writers
Mozilla people